Hong Kong Electronic Industries Association (HKEIA) is a non-profit, non-government trade body of the Hong Kong electronics industry.

HKEIA Awards
The HKEIA Awards are organized by the association and the Hong Kong Trade Development Council (HKTDC), organizer of Hong Kong Electronics Fair and electronicAsia.  The HKEIA Awards are announced and presented during  the Hong Kong Electronics Fair.

There are four award categories:
  Consumer Electronics,
 Personal Electronics,
 Security Products and
 Parts / Components

References

External links 
 Innovations win HKEIA prizes, People's Daily Online, 2005

Business organisations based in Hong Kong